Stefanie Heinzmann is the third studio album by Swiss recording artist Stefanie Heinzmann, released by Universal Music Domestic on 16 March 2012 in German-speaking Europe.

Critical reception

Kai Butterweck from laut.de rated the album two stars out of five and found that Stefanie Heinzmann "stinks like wasted talent."

Track listing

Charts

Weekly charts

Year-end charts

Release history

References

2012 albums
Stefanie Heinzmann albums